Milton Ariel Wynants Vázquez (born March 29, 1972  in Paysandú) is a racing cyclist from Uruguay, who was affiliated with the Veloz Club Sanducero.

Wynants competed in four consecutive Summer Olympics for his native country (From Atlanta 1996 to Beijing 2008). He won the silver medal in the men's points race at his second Olympic appearance, in Sydney, Australia (2000), the first Olympic medal for Uruguay in 36 years and the only one since.

He has collected medals at each Pan American Games between 1995 and 2007: silver at the Points Race that edition, bronze at the Points Race in 1999, gold at the Points Race and Individual Road Race in 2003, and bronze at the Points Race in 2007.

Wynants competed with Tomás Margalef in the 2002 Pan American Championships, winning the madison bronze medal.

References

External links
 
 

1972 births
Living people
Cyclists at the 1995 Pan American Games
Cyclists at the 1996 Summer Olympics
Cyclists at the 1999 Pan American Games
Cyclists at the 2000 Summer Olympics
Cyclists at the 2003 Pan American Games
Cyclists at the 2004 Summer Olympics
Cyclists at the 2007 Pan American Games
Cyclists at the 2008 Summer Olympics
Olympic cyclists of Uruguay
Olympic silver medalists for Uruguay
Uruguayan people of Belgian descent
Sportspeople from Paysandú
Olympic medalists in cycling
Medalists at the 2000 Summer Olympics
Pan American Games gold medalists for Uruguay
Pan American Games silver medalists for Uruguay
Pan American Games bronze medalists for Uruguay
Uruguayan track cyclists
Uruguayan male cyclists
Pan American Games medalists in cycling
Medalists at the 1995 Pan American Games
Medalists at the 2003 Pan American Games
Medalists at the 2007 Pan American Games